The 1906 Nova Scotia general election was held on 20 June 1906 to elect members of the 34th House of Assembly of the Province of Nova Scotia, Canada. It was won by the Liberal party.

Results

Results by party

Retiring incumbents
Liberal
George A. Cox, Shelburne
Michael Edwin Keefe, Halifax
Henry T. Laurence, Colchester
George Mitchell, Halifax
George G. Sanderson, Yarmouth
John Drew Sperry, Lunenburg

Nominated candidates
1906 Nova Scotia Provincial Election

Legend
bold denotes party leader
† denotes an incumbent who is not running for re-election or was defeated in nomination contest

Valley

|-
| rowspan="2"|Annapolis
||
|Orlando Daniels2,06229.46%	
|
|A. L. Davison1,67423.91%	
|
|
||
|Orlando Daniels
|-
||
|Joseph A. Bancroft1,82626.09%	
|
|Alfred Wightman1,43820.54%	
|
|
||
|Joseph A. Bancroft
|-
| rowspan="2"|Digby
||
|Ambroise-Hilaire Comeau1,37632.51%	
|
|M. H. Marshall82919.59%	
|
|
||
|Ambroise-Hilaire Comeau
|-
||
|Angus Morrison Gidney1,25329.61%	
|
|A. A. Theriault77418.29%	
|
|
||
|Angus Morrison Gidney
|-
| rowspan="2"|Hants
||
|Arthur Drysdale1,93426.19%
|
|E. A. O'Brien1,80024.37%
|
|
||
|Arthur Drysdale
|-	
|
|Francis Parker McHeffey1,79224.27%
||
|Charles Smith Wilcox1,85925.17%	
|
|
||
|Francis Parker McHeffey
|-
| rowspan="2"|Kings
||
|Brenton Dodge2,15225.83%	
|
|
|
|E. W. Sawyer1,97723.72% (Union Reform)
||
|Brenton Dodge
|-	
|
|Harry H. Wickwire2,05624.67%	
|
|	
||
|Charles Alexander Campbell2,14825.78% (Union Reform)
||
|Harry H. Wickwire
|-
|}

South Shore

|-
| rowspan="2"|Lunenburg
||
|Charles Uniacke Mader2,27426.12%	
|
|C. S. Marshall2,14724.66%	
|
|
||
|Charles Uniacke Mader
|-
||
|Henry March2,25425.89%	
|
|C. A. Lander2,03123.33%	
|
|
||
|John Drew Sperry†
|-
| rowspan="2"|Queens
||
|Edward Matthew Farrell1,00831.28%	
|
|J. S. Hughes75423.40%	
|
|
||
|Edward Matthew Farrell
|-
||
|Charles F. Cooper87427.13%	
|
|J. C. Pyke58618.19%	
|
|
||
|Charles F. Cooper
|-
| rowspan="2"|Shelburne
||
|Moses H. Nickerson1,08328.08%	
|
|N. R. Craig93024.11%	
|
|
||
|Moses H. Nickerson
|-
||
|Robert Irwin97525.28%	
|
|T. C. Lockwood86922.53%	
|
|
||
|George A. Cox†
|-
| rowspan="2"|Yarmouth
||
|Ernest Howard Armstrong1,58634.20%	
|
|A. M. Perrin81517.57%	
|
|
||
|George G. Sanderson†
|-
||
|Henry S. LeBlanc1,42530.72%	
|
|Raymond Neri d'Entremont81217.51%	
|
|
||
|Henry S. LeBlanc
|-
|}

Fundy-Northeast

|-
| rowspan="2"|Colchester
||
|William Davison Hill2,56728.76%	
|
|J. H. McCleave2,17724.39%	
|
|
||
|Henry T. Laurence†
|-
||
|Benjamin Franklin Pearson2,38626.73%	
|
|John Suckling1,79520.11%	
|
|
||
|Benjamin Franklin Pearson
|-
| rowspan="2"|Cumberland
||
|Elisha B. Paul3,61926.57%	
|
|C. F. Jameison2,99521.99%
|
|
||
|Elisha B. Paul
|-
||
|William Thomas Pipes3,58726.34%	
|
|Daniel J. McLeod3,41925.10%	
|
|
||
|Daniel J. McLeod
|-
|}

Halifax

|-
| rowspan="3"|Halifax
||
|David McPherson5,55019.23%	
|
|G.M. Campbell4,42315.33%	
|
|
||
|David McPherson
|-
||
|George Everett Faulkner5,47518.97%	
|
|W.M. Sedgewick4,09314.18%	
|
|
||
|George Mitchell†
|-
||
|Robert Emmett Finn5,37218.62%	
|
|W.F. O'Connor3,94313.66%	
|
|
||
|Michael Edwin Keefe†
|-
|}

Central Nova

|-
| rowspan="2"|Antigonish	
||
|Fred Robert TrotterAcclamation
|
|
|
|
||
|Fred Robert Trotter	
|-	
||
|Christopher P. ChisholmAcclamation
|
|	
|
|	
||
|Christopher P. Chisholm
|-
| rowspan="2"|Guysborough
||
|James F. Ellis1,70529.30%	
|
|Simon Osborn Giffin1,32522.77%	
|
|
||
|James F. Ellis
|-
||
|William Whitman1,63428.08%	
|
|G.A.R. Rowlings1,15519.85%	
|
|
||
|William Whitman
|-
| rowspan="3"|Pictou
||
|Robert M. McGregor3,83217.50%
|
|George E. Munro3,37215.40%
|
|
||
|Robert M. McGregor
|-
|
|George Patterson3,54616.19%	
||
|John M. Baillie3,61716.52%
|
|
||
|George Patterson
|-
|
|Robert Hugh MacKay3,54616.19%
||
|Charles Elliott Tanner3,98318.19%
|
|	
||
|Charles Elliott Tanner	
|-
|}

Cape Breton

|-
| rowspan="2"|Cape Breton
||
|Arthur Samuel Kendall5,22526.66%	
|
|J. W. Madden4,77724.37%	
|
|
||
|Arthur Samuel Kendall
|-
||
|Neil J. Gillis4,89724.98%	
|
|Robert Hamilton Butts4,70223.99%	
|
|
||
|Neil J. Gillis
|-
| rowspan="4"|Inverness
||
|James MacDonald2,05222.26%
|rowspan=2|
|rowspan=2|Daniel McNeil1,09911.92%	
|rowspan=2|
|rowspan=2|
|rowspan=2 |
|rowspan=2|James MacDonald
|-	
|
|H. C. Hache1,54016.70%
|-
|
|Moses J. Doucet1,53016.59%
|rowspan=2 |
|rowspan=2|Charles Edward McMillan1,63917.78%	
|rowspan=2|
|rowspan=2|
|rowspan=2 |
|rowspan=2|Moses J. Doucet
|-
|
|Dougald MacLachan1,36014.75%
|-
| rowspan="2"|Richmond
||
|Charles P. Bissett1,14036.66%
|
|Edward Doyle39812.80%	
|
|
||
|Charles P. Bissett
|-	
|
|Simon Joyce76624.63%	
||
|Felix Landry80625.92%
|
|
||
|Simon Joyce
|-
| rowspan="2"|Victoria
||
|George Henry MurrayAcclamation
|
|
|
|
||
|George Henry Murray
|-
||
|John Gillis MorrisonAcclamation
|
|	
|
|
||
|John Gillis Morrison
|-
|}

References

Further reading
 

1906
Nova Scotia general election
General election
Nova Scotia general election